The Petaling Jaya Dispersal Link Expressway (PDLE) (formerly Kinrara–Damansara Expressway (KIDEX) or KIDEX Skyway) was a new expressway under planning in Klang Valley, Malaysia. The  expressway connects the Damansara–NKVE Interchange of the New Klang Valley Expressway in the north to Bandar Kinrara in the south. The new expressway was claimed to reduce travelling time between Damansara and Kinrara by about 25%, and reduce traffic volume by 5% in both directions from Puchong to Petaling Jaya. On 16 February 2015, after several protests by the local residents, the KIDEX Skyway project was cancelled by the Selangor State Government. On 2018, the project is revived as Petaling Jaya Dispersal Link Expressway.

Route
The expressway was planned to start near the Damansara-NKVE Interchange of the New Klang Valley Expressway (NKVE). It would have run elevated above the SPRINT highway until swinging right at Damansara Intan. It would have cut through section 17, past Jasmine Towers and SS2 mall, before running (still elevated) above the entire length of Jalan Semangat. At the end of Jalan Semangat at the junction of Jalan Utara the highway would have split.

The southern carriageway would have passed the Sri Petaling and Bukit Bintang Boys School, and run elevated above Jalan Utara. An off ramp would have fed the traffic destined for the Federal Highway, Petaling Jaya State or University Hospital into Jalan Utara, before the Ehsan Ria Condominium.  The elevated road would have continued past Amcorp Mall and around PJ State until rejoining the northern carriageway near the Section 8 police station. From Section 8 PJ the proposed highway headed south through Section 4 and Old Town PJ south, crossing the NPE and KESAS highways before ending at Bandar Kinrara 2.

Origins 
2010 – Various proposals were submitted by the private sector for the Damansara – Petaling Jaya – Kinrara corridor to the Malaysian Government. The Damansara – Petaling Jaya – Kinrara corridor was announced in the RMK-10 Budget.

2011 – After reviewing the various proposals, the Malaysian Government issued the Approval in Principle (AIP) to the concessionaire to proceed with detailed studies.

2012 – MTES Approval in Principle on 23 February 2012.

2013 – The Concession Agreement (C.A) for Kinrara – Damansara  Expressway (KIDEX) was signed on 15 November 2013.

Claimed features
 Fully elevated expressway with 90% of the alignment being on existing road reserves.
 There are seven interchanges along expressways including Damansara-NKVE, Bandar Utama, Damansara-Sprint, Federal Highway FHR2, Taman Dato Harun-NPE, Kinrara-KESAS and Kinrara–Bukit Jalil Highway.
 There are three toll plaza located at Damansara-NKVE (PLUS), Section 17 and Taman Dato' Harun.
 Separated carriageway in Petaling Jaya.

Cost
The expressway was estimated to cost RM2.42bil and it would have been a 90% elevated expressway. Financing for the highway was to be met through private investors, and the Malaysian government was to pay for acquisition of property along the route.  The road was to be a tolled highway, with the toll rate set by the Malaysian government.  Most highways in Malaysia have been built and operated by private concessionaires.

Route Background 
The route will start from Damansara via Bandar Utama, Damansara Tropicana, Jalan Utara, Petaling Jaya New Town, Taman Dato Harun, Kinrara until Bandar Kinrara district.

List of Interchanges 
{| class="plainrowheaders wikitable"
|-
!scope="col" | km
!scope="col" | Exit
!scope="col" | Name
!scope="col" | Destinations
!scope="col" | Notes
|-
|
| 
|Damansara Interchange
|  New Klang Valley Expressway
|
|-
|
|
| Damansara toll plazaDMR||   ||West bound
|-
|style="width:600px" colspan="7" style="text-align:center" bgcolor="green"|Damansara toll plazaDMRMyRFID        Closed toll systemsTouch in and Touch out your Touch n go cards and pay a distance toll
|-
|style="width:600px" colspan="6" style="text-align:center" bgcolor="green"| New Klang Valley ExpresswayPLUS Expressway border limit
|-
|style="width:600px" colspan="6" style="text-align:center" bgcolor="blue"| Petaling Jaya Dispersal Link Expressway(Under planning)Prolintas border limit
|-
|-bgcolor=#ffdead
|0
| ----
|Bandar Utama Interchange
|
|
|-
|-bgcolor=#ffdead
|1
|
|
|
|
|-bgcolor=#ffdead
|2
|
|
|
|
|-bgcolor=#ffdead
|
| ----
|Damansara-Tropicana Interchange
| Damansara Link
|Under planning
|-bgcolor=#ffdead
|3
|
|
|
|
|-bgcolor=#ffdead
|4
|
|
|
|
|-bgcolor=#ffdead
|5
|
|
|
|
|-
|style="width:600px" colspan="7" style="text-align:center" bgcolor="green"|<span style="color:white;">Jalan Harapan toll plaza  MyRFID Opened toll systemsPay toll
|-
|
|
|-bgcolor=#ffdead
|
|colspan=4 align= center | Northern end of separated carriageway
|-bgcolor=#ffdead
| 
| ----
|Jalan Utara Interchange
|
|Under planning
|-bgcolor=#ffdead
|6
|
|
|
|-
|-bgcolor=#ffdead
|7
|
|
|
|
|-bgcolor=#ffdead
|
| ----
||Petaling Jaya New Town Interchange
|
|Under planning
|-bgcolor=#ffdead
|
|colspan=4 align= center | Southern end of separated carriageway
|-bgcolor=#ffdead
|8
|
|
|
|
|-bgcolor=#ffdead
|9
|
|
|
|
|-bgcolor=#ffdead
|
| ----
|Taman Dato Harun Interchange
| New Pantai Expressway
|Under planning
|-bgcolor=#ffdead
|10
|
|
|
|
|-
|style="width:600px" colspan="7" style="text-align:center" bgcolor="green"|<span style="color:white;">Kinrara toll plaza  MyRFID Opened toll systemsPay toll
|-
|
|
|-bgcolor=#ffdead
| 
| ----
|Kinrara-SAE Interchange
| Shah Alam Expressway
|Under planning
|-bgcolor=#ffdead
|11
|
|
|
|
|-bgcolor=#ffdead
|12
|
|
|
|
|-bgcolor=#ffdead
|
| ----
|Bandar Kinrara-Section 2 Interchange
|
|Under planning
|-bgcolor=#ffdead
|13
|
|
|
|
|-bgcolor=#ffdead
|style="width:600px" colspan="6" style="text-align:center" bgcolor="blue"| Petaling Jaya Dispersal Link Expressway(Under planning)Prolintas border limit
|-
| 
| ----
|Bandar Kinrara Interchange
| Bukit Jalil Highway
|Under planning
|-bgcolor=#ffdead

References

External links
 EMRAIL Sdn Bhd Website
 KIDEX Expressway Website
 Zabima Website
 New highway to be built between Damansara and Kinrara - The Star, 14 March 2014
 KIDEX highway alignment
 Taxi Drivers in Support of KIDEX - The Star Metro, January 12, 2015
 Friends of KIDEX Express Support for KIDEX Highway Project, New Straits Times, January 14, 2015
 NGOs and Residents Associations in Petaling Jaya Support KIDEX Project - The Star Metro, January 15, 2015
 Only Partial Acquisitions to be Made, says KIDEX - The Star Metro,January 28, 2015
 KIDEX Estimates 327 Lots to be Acquired - The Star Metro, February 2, 2015
 Kidex Preliminary Environmental Impact Assessment
 Kidex route alignment
 new highway -2016may
 kidex dev involve in new proposed pjd link -2016jun
 No new highways allowed -2019oct
 Poser over highway revival -2020sep
 highway-revival-surprises-state-rep/ News on highway revival -2020sep

Expressways in Malaysia
Proposed roads in Malaysia
Cancelled expressway projects in Malaysia